Simpang-kanan River (means: Right Junction River) is a river in northern Sumatra, Indonesia, about 1400 km northwest of the capital Jakarta.

Geography
The river flows in the northern area of Sumatra with predominantly tropical rainforest climate (designated as Af in the Köppen-Geiger climate classification). The annual average temperature in the area is 23 °C. The warmest month is February, when the average temperature is around 25 °C, and the coldest is April, at 22 °C. The average annual rainfall is 3355 mm. The wettest month is December, with an average of 463 mm rainfall, and the driest is June, with 125 mm rainfall.

See also
List of rivers of Indonesia
List of rivers of Sumatra

References

Rivers of North Sumatra
Rivers of Aceh
Rivers of Indonesia